K16 may refer to:

Aviation 
Aircraft
 Junkers K 16, a German airline
 Kelsey K-16, an American glider

Airports
 Becks Grove Airport, in Oneida County, New York
 Seoul Air Base, designated as K-16 by the United States Air Force

Other uses 
 K–16, an American education movement
 K-16 (Kansas highway)
 Dasan Machineries K16, a South Korean submachine gun
 , K-class submarine of the Royal Navy
 Keratin 16
 Symphony No. 1 (Mozart), by Wolfgang Amadeus Mozart